James Parr may refer to:

 James Parr (baseball) (born 1986), American baseball player
 James Parr (politician) (1869–1941), New Zealand lawyer and politician
 Jim Parr (1928–2000), full name James Gordon Parr, Canadian academic, broadcaster and provincial civil servant